The Fair Armenia Party is an Armenian political party.

History
The Fair Armenia Party was established on 20 January 2021, during a party congress held in Yerevan. Norayr Norikyan is the founder and chairman of the party. The party confirmed its intentions to participate in the 2021 Armenian parliamentary elections. Following the election, the party won just 0.31% of the popular vote and failed to gain any representation in the National Assembly. The party announced that it recognized the results of the elections and that it would seek to cooperate with other political groups. The party currently acts as an extra-parliamentary force.

Ideology
The party believes in creating a strong and influential state, improving socio-economic development, eliminating political corruption and all forms of discrimination, strengthening the rule of law and social justice, protecting the environment, encouraging immigration from the Armenian Diaspora and fighting for international recognition of the Armenian genocide.

In regards to foreign affairs, the party favors both the European integration of Armenia, while also affirming that Armenia should remain a member of the Eurasian Union and further integrate within it. The party believes that Armenia belongs to the "European family" of states and should fully implement the Armenia-EU Comprehensive and Enhanced Partnership Agreement with the EU, while at the same time, also maintain strong economic ties with Russia.

The party also believes in the right to self-determination for Artsakh, maintaining Armenia's membership in the CSTO, and normalizing relations with Turkey and Azerbaijan following a peaceful settlement to the Nagorno-Karabakh conflict. The party is strongly critical of the 2020 Nagorno-Karabakh ceasefire agreement.

In addition, the party seeks to develop closer relations with the United States and NATO, India, China, Georgia, Iran, among others.

Activities
On 22 March 2021, Fair Armenia representatives met with the President of Armenia, Armen Sargsyan to discuss the political situation in the country.

On 1 April 2021, the Fair Armenia Party signed a joint declaration with 4 other political parties calling on the Government of Armenia to ensure free and fair upcoming elections, following the on-going political unrest in Armenia.

Electoral record

Parliamentary elections

See also

 Programs of political parties in Armenia

References

External links 
 Fair Armenia Party on Facebook

Political parties established in 2021
Political parties in Armenia
2021 establishments in Armenia
Pro-European political parties in Armenia